Emiliano Salvetti (born 1 January 1974 in Forlì) is an Italian former footballer who played as a midfielder.

He is best known for his time as a Cesena mainstay from 1996 to 1999, and again from 2004 to 2008. He scored 18 goals for the club during the 2005–06 Serie B season, one of the team's records for a midfielder. In June 2008, following Cesena's relegation to Serie C1, he accepted an offer from Sassuolo in order to keep playing in the league.

External links
Emiliano Salvetti at Cesena Calcio 

1974 births
Living people
Italian footballers
Italy youth international footballers
A.C. Cesena players
Forlì F.C. players
Hellas Verona F.C. players
Bologna F.C. 1909 players
S.P.A.L. players
U.S. Sassuolo Calcio players
Serie A players
Serie B players
Serie C players
Serie D players
Association football midfielders
People from Forlì
Footballers from Emilia-Romagna
Sportspeople from the Province of Forlì-Cesena